Kummerow is a municipality in the Mecklenburgische Seenplatte district, in Mecklenburg-Vorpommern, Germany. It is often called Kummerow am See to avoid confusion with Kummerow near Stralsund. The timber framed village church and the baroque castle at the lake (Kummerower See) are notable landmarks.

References

External links

Official website of Kummerow am See (German)

Populated places established in the 13th century
1250s establishments in the Holy Roman Empire
1255 establishments in Europe
Municipalities in Mecklenburg-Western Pomerania
Mecklenburgische Seenplatte (district)